Juan Carlos Ortiz Escobar (died in 2002) a.k.a. Cuchilla was a Colombian drug dealer and high ranking member of the Cali Cartel.

Ortiz-Escobar was killed in 2002, after getting out of jail, by orders of Wilber Varela a.k.a. Jabón after he found out that he was working with the Herrera clan who were enemies of Jabón

References

Cali Cartel traffickers
Colombian drug traffickers
Colombian people convicted of murder
People convicted of murder by Colombia
Colombian murder victims
People murdered in Colombia
2002 deaths
Year of birth missing